Magnolia kachirachirai (syn. Parakmeria kachirachirai) is a species of flowering plant in the family Magnoliaceae. It is endemic to Taiwan.

This is a tree growing up to 20 meters tall. The leathery oval-shaped leaves are up to 12 centimeters long. It bears bisexual flowers with whorls of yellow tepals and many stamens.

This species is known from just a few locations in fragmented habitat. Its populations are declining. Its habitat is cleared for human use and it is cut for timber. It is also grown as an ornamental.

References

kachirachirai
Endemic flora of Taiwan
Endangered flora of Asia
Taxonomy articles created by Polbot